The title champion jockey may refer to:

 British jump racing Champion Jockey
 British flat racing Champion Jockey
 Irish flat racing Champion Jockey
 Irish jump racing Champion Jockey
 United States Champion Jockey by wins
 United States Champion Jockey by earnings
 French flat racing Champion Jockey
 Champion Jockey: G1 Jockey & Gallop Racer